Douglas Gap is a glacier-filled gap, 1.5 nautical miles (3 km) wide, between the Hedgpeth Heights and the Quam Heights in the Anare Mountains of Victoria Land, Antarctica. It was mapped by the United States Geological Survey from surveys and U.S. Navy air photos, 1960–63, and was named by the Advisory Committee on Antarctic Names for Donald S. Douglas, a United States Antarctic Research Program biologist at Hallett Station, 1959–60 and 1960–61. This mountain pass lies situated on the Pennell Coast, a portion of Antarctica lying between Cape Williams and Cape Adare.

References 

Mountain passes of Victoria Land
Pennell Coast